Davis Fisher (born November 21, 1997) is an American professional motorcycle racer. He competes in the AMA Pro Flat Track championship since 2014, winning the GNC2 championship in 2015 and competing in the GNC1 Championship in 2016.

AMA Pro Flat Track

Fisher raced in the AMA Pro Flat Track Series beginning in 2014 at the age of just 16.  He scored TK wins and TKT podiums in his rookie year, finishing the championship in second  place, just one point shy of Champion Kyle Johnson. 
In 2015, Fisher clinched the GNC2 championship with two rounds remaining.  Aside from three mechanical DNFs, he placed no lower than second in any of the races for the season.

X Games Harley-Davidson Flat-Track

Fisher competed in the 2016 X Games Harley-Davidson Flat-Track, qualifying 17th in practice, placing 3rd in his heat race, and placing 8th in the final—all aboard his Harley-Davidson XG750R.

Superprestigio of the Americas

Fisher was invited to participate in the inaugural Superprestigio of the Americas.  He placed 6th in the Final aboard his Honda CRF450R.

Career highlights

2014– 2nd, AMA GNC2 Championship    Parkinson Brothers Racing CRF450R
2015– AMA GNC2 Champion Parkinson Brothers Racing CRF450R

References

External links
 
 
 
 

1997 births
Living people
American motorcycle racers
AMA Grand National Championship riders
People from Columbia County, Oregon
Sportspeople from Oregon